Cœur brûle et autres romances  is the title of a collection of short stories  written in French by French Nobel laureate J. M. G. Le Clézio.

Interview with Le Clézio
In an interview conducted by Tirthankar Chanda with Le Clézio,Chanda asks
whether since Cœur brûlé et autres romances is partly set in Mexico, could it be said that the two sisters are victims of a nomadic life?Le Clézio answered that these two sisters "are victims of having belonged to two different cultures at the same time. It is very difficult for children to relate to two cultures as different as Mexican culture, which is more of an immediate, street, outside culture, and European culture which is based on the home, the indoors and school rules. It was the clash of cultures that I wanted to recount".Chanda then asked "So why a "romance"? to which Le Clézio replied "This was a slightly ironic word to describe some tragic situations. The book consists of seven dark short stories."Le Clézio continued by saying that "in romantic fiction, feeling takes precedence over sociological truth. I think that the role of fiction is to highlight this constant slippage between emotion and the social, real, world. On the other hand, all the stories in this collection are based on actual events that I have adapted. So they are true stories. They have an element of the 'sentimentality' that you also find in the 'News in Brief' pages of the newspapers".

Seven short stories 
The book consists of seven dark short stories
 Coeur brûle
 Chercher l'aventure
 Hôtel de la Solitude
 Trois aventurières
 Kalima
 Vent du Sud
 Trésor

Critical reception
According to Allen Thiher in his review of Coeur brule et autres romances this collection is a mixed affair .The review can be read online :

Publication history

First French Edition

Second French Edition

Third French Edition

Fourth French Edition

References

2000 short story collections
Short story collections by J. M. G. Le Clézio
Works by J. M. G. Le Clézio